Ababil or Ababeel may refer to:
Ababeel (NGO), a charitable organization based in Jammu and Kashmir
Ababeel (missile), a Pakistani MIRV-capable Medium-range ballistic missile
Ababil-100, an Iraqi single-stage Short-range ballistic missile
HESA Ababil, an Iranian unmanned aerial vehicle
Ababil (religious), a miraculous bird that, according to Islamic teachings, protected Mecca from the Aksumite army of Abraha
Ababeel1, the first Palestinian reconnaissance unmanned combat aerial vehicle